A stone row or stone alignment is a linear arrangement of upright, parallel megalithic standing stones set at intervals along a common axis or series of axes, usually dating from the later Neolithic or Bronze Age. Rows may be individual or grouped, and three or more stones aligned can constitute a stone row.

Description

Stone rows can be few metres or several kilometres in length and made from stones that can be as tall as 2m, although 1m high stones are more common. The terminals of many rows have the largest stones and other megalithic features are sometimes sited at the ends, especially burial cairns. The stones are placed at intervals and may vary in height along the sequence, to provide a graduated appearance, though it is not known whether this was done deliberately. Stone rows  were erected by the later Neolithic and Bronze Age peoples in the British Isles, parts of Scandinavia and northern France. 

The most famous example is the Carnac stones, a complex of stone rows in Brittany. There are a number of examples on Dartmoor including the row at Stalldown Barrow and three rows at Drizzlecombe and the Hill O Many Stanes in Caithness. In Britain they are exclusively found in isolated moorland areas.  The term alignment is sometimes taken to imply that the rows were placed purposely in relation to other factors such as other monuments or topographical or astronomical features. Archaeologists treat stone rows as discrete features however and alignment refers to the stones being lined up with one another rather than anything else. Their purpose is thought to be religious or ceremonial perhaps marking a processual route. Another theory is that each generation would erect a new stone to contribute to a sequence that demonstrated a people's continual presence.

Examples
 Beenalaght - Six stones (one fallen), County Cork, Ireland
Coolcoulaghta Standing Stones - two stones, County Cork, Ireland
Eightercua - Four stones, County Kerry, Ireland
Knocknakilla - Four stones (one fallen), County Cork, Ireland
Maughanasilly Stone Row - five stones (one fallen), County Cork, Ireland

Notes

Sources
 Power, Denis (1997). Archaeological inventory of County Cork, Volume 3: Mid Cork, 9467. ColorBooks. .
 Lancaster Brown, P. (1976). Megaliths, myths, and men: an introduction to astro-archaeology. New York: Taplinger Pub. Co.

External links

English Heritage Monument Description Thesaurus listing
Megalith Map of Stone Circles and Rows

Megalithic monuments
Types of monuments and memorials
Bronze Age Europe
Stone Age Europe
Stone monuments and memorials